Aenigmaticus may refer to the following species:

 Nosmips aenigmaticus, a rare fossil primate
 Clavus aenigmaticus, a species of sea snail
 Icosteus aenigmaticus, an odd ray-finned fish of the northern Pacific Ocean
 Pietschellus aenigmaticus, an extinct genus of enigmatic bony fish
 Microlestes aenigmaticus, a species of ground beetle